The Optional Protocol to the Convention on the Rights of the Child on a Communications Procedure is a treaty open to states that are party to the Convention on the Rights of the Child. The Protocol was adopted by the United Nations' General Assembly on 19 December 2011 and entered into force on 14 April 2014, following ratification by 10 states.

As of Oct. 2022, the Protocol has been signed by 52 states and ratified or acceded by 50 states.

References

See also
First Optional Protocol to the International Covenant on Civil and Political Rights
Optional Protocol to the Convention on the Elimination of All Forms of Discrimination against Women 
Optional Protocol to the Convention on the Rights of Persons with Disabilities

Optional Protocol to the Convention on the Rights of the Child on a Communications Procedure
Treaties entered into force in 2014
Treaties concluded in 2011
United Nations treaties
Treaties of Albania
Treaties of Andorra
Treaties of Argentina
Treaties of Belgium
Treaties of Bolivia
Treaties of Brazil
Treaties of Chile
Treaties of Costa Rica
Treaties of Croatia
Treaties of Cyprus
Treaties of the Czech Republic
Treaties of Denmark
Treaties of Ecuador
Treaties of El Salvador
Treaties of Finland
Treaties of France
Treaties of Gabon
Treaties of Georgia (country)
Treaties of Germany
Treaties of Ireland
Treaties of Italy
Treaties of Liechtenstein
Treaties of Luxembourg
Treaties of Monaco
Treaties of Mongolia
Treaties of Montenegro
Treaties of Panama
Treaties of Peru
Treaties of Portugal
Treaties of Samoa
Treaties of San Marino
Treaties of Slovenia
Treaties of Slovakia
Treaties of Spain
Treaties of Switzerland
Treaties of Thailand
Treaties of Tunisia
Treaties of Turkey
Treaties of Ukraine
Treaties of Uruguay
2011 politics in New York (state)
Treaties adopted by United Nations General Assembly resolutions